The 2021 season was IFK Göteborg's 116th in existence, their 89th season in Allsvenskan and their 45th consecutive season in the league. They competed in Allsvenskan and Svenska Cupen. League play started on 11 April and ended on 4 December.

Players

Squad

Club

Coaching staff

Other information

Competitions

Overall

Allsvenskan

League table

Results summary

Results by round

Matches
Kickoff times are in UTC+2 unless stated otherwise.

Svenska Cupen

2020–21
The tournament continued from the 2020 season.

Kickoff times are in UTC+1.

Group stage

2021–22
The tournament continued into the 2022 season.

Qualification stage

Non competitive

Pre-season
Kickoff times are in UTC+1 unless stated otherwise.

Mid-season

Notes

References

IFK Göteborg seasons
IFK Goteborg